Itamar Ben-Gvir (born 6 May 1976) is an Israeli lawyer and politician, who serves as the Minister of National Security. He is additionally a member of the Knesset and leader of Otzma Yehudit. His political position has been described as far-right.

Ben-Gvir, a settler in the Israeli-occupied West Bank, has faced charges of hate speech against Arabs and was known to have a portrait in his living room of Israeli-American terrorist Baruch Goldstein, who massacred 29 Palestinian Muslim worshipers and wounded 125 others in Hebron, in the 1994 Cave of the Patriarchs massacre. He removed the portrait after he entered politics. He was also previously convicted of supporting a terrorist group known as Kach, which espoused Kahanism, an extremist religious Zionist ideology. 

Under his leadership, the Otzma Yehudit (Jewish Power), a party which espouses Kahanism and anti-Arabism, won six seats in the 2022 Israeli legislative election, and is represented in what has been called the most right-wing and hardline government in Israel's history. He has called for the expulsion of Arab citizens of Israel who are not loyal to Israel. As a lawyer, he is known for defending Jewish radicals on trial in Israel. 

Ben Gvir had been long accused of being a provocateur, having previously led several visits to the Temple Mount as activist and member of Knesset, contentious marches through Jerusalem's Old City Muslim Quarter, and set up an office in the Sheikh Jarrah neighborhood which witnessed several evictions of Palestinians. On 3 January 2023, he visited the Temple Mount where the al-Aqsa Mosque is located, spurring an international wave of criticism that labelled his visit purposely provocative.

Early life 
Itamar Ben-Gvir was born in Mevaseret Zion. His father was born in Jerusalem to Iraqi Jewish immigrants. He worked at a gasoline company and dabbled in writing. His mother was a Kurdish Jewish immigrant who had been active in the Irgun as a teenager and was a homemaker. His family was secular, but as a teenager he adopted religious and radical right-wing views during the First Intifada. He first joined a right-wing youth movement affiliated with Moledet, a party which advocated transferring Arabs out of Israel, and then joined the youth movement of the even more radical Kach and Kahane Chai party, which was eventually designated as a terrorist organization and outlawed by the Israeli government. He became youth coordinator of Kach, and claimed that he was detained at age 14. When he came of age for conscription into the Israel Defense Forces at 18, he was exempted from service by the IDF due to his extreme-right political background.

Ben-Gvir continued to be associated with the Kahanist movement, of which his party, Otzma Yehudit, is said to be one of the ideological successors to Kahane.  However, when forming the Otzma Yehudit party, he claimed that it would not be a Kach Kahane Chai or splinter group. He carried out a series of far-right activities that have resulted in dozens of indictments. In a November 2015 interview, he claimed to have been indicted 53 times. In most cases, the charges were thrown out of court. In 2007, however, he was convicted for incitement to racism.

In the 1990s, he was active in protests against the Oslo Accords. In 1995, a few weeks before the assassination of Prime Minister Yitzhak Rabin, Ben-Gvir came to public attention for the first time when he appeared on television brandishing a Cadillac hood ornament that had been stolen from Rabin's car and declared: "We got to his car, and we'll get to him too."

Legal career 

Ben-Gvir sometimes represented himself during his many indictments, and at the suggestion of several judges, he decided to study law. Ben-Gvir studied law at the Ono Academic College. At the end of his studies, the Israel Bar Association blocked him from taking the bar exam on grounds of his criminal record. Ben-Gvir claimed the decision was politically motivated. After a series of appeals, this decision was overturned, but it was ruled that Ben-Gvir would first have to settle three criminal cases in which he was charged at the time. After being acquitted in all three cases on charges including holding an illegal gathering and disturbing a civil servant, Ben-Gvir was allowed to take the exam. He passed the written and oral examinations, and was granted a license to practice law.

As a lawyer, Ben-Gvir has represented a series of far-right Jewish activists suspected of terrorism and hate crimes. Notable clients include Benzi Gopstein and two teenagers charged in the Duma arson attack. Haaretz described Ben-Gvir as the "go-to man" for Jewish extremists facing legal trouble, and reported that his client list "reads like a 'Who's Who' of suspects in Jewish terror cases and hate crimes in Israel". Ben-Gvir is also the lawyer for Lehava, a far-right Israeli anti-assimilation organization which is active in opposing Jewish intermarriage with non-Jews, and has sued the waqf.  

Ben-Gvir says that his work as a lawyer for far-right Jewish activists is motivated by a desire to help them, and not for money.

Political career 
Ben-Gvir was the parliamentary assistant in the 18th Knesset for Michael Ben-Ari. On 23 July 2017, he was part of the leadership of a protest that included dozens of people outside of the Prime Minister's office in Jerusalem. The protest was held by both Lehava and Otzma Yehudit.

On 25 February 2019, Ben-Gvir said that Arab citizens of Israel who were not loyal to Israel "must be expelled". 

Prior to entering office Ben-Gvir was known to have a portrait in his living room of Israeli-American terrorist Baruch Goldstein, who massacred 29 Palestinian Muslim worshipers and wounded 125 others in Hebron, in the 1994 Cave of the Patriarchs massacre; he removed the portrait in preparation for the 2020 Israeli legislative election in hope of being allowed to run on the unified right list headed by Naftali Bennett.

Ben-Gvir had planned to run for a seat in the Knesset in the September 2019 Israeli legislative election in the first slot of a combined Noam/Otzma Yehudit electoral list, though the two parties split over Otzma's inclusion of a secular candidate on the combined list (which Noam disagreed with). Ben-Gvir was in the third slot of a joint list that includes Otzma Yehudit, Noam and the Religious Zionist Party that ran in the 2021 Israeli legislative election. He was elected to the Knesset as the alliance won six seats.

In May 2021, he was reported to be frequenting the East Jerusalem neighborhood of Sheikh Jarrah, in a show of solidarity with Jewish settlers who live there.

In October 2021, Ben-Gvir and Joint List leader Ayman Odeh had a physical confrontation during a visit to the Kaplan Medical Center to see Miqdad Qawasmeh, a Hamas operative who had been on a hunger strike for over three months of his administrative detention. Ben-Gvir was against Qawasmeh being treated in an Israeli hospital, and stated that he had visited to check the detainee's conditions, as well as to "see up close this miracle that a person remains alive despite not eating for several months". As Ben-Gvir attempted to enter Qawasmeh's room, he accused Odeh of being a terrorist for supporting extremists like Qawasmeh. Odeh then struck first, pushing Ben-Gvir, and the pair began to scuffle before being separated by bystanders. Ben-Gvir later filed a complaint against Odeh, claiming that he had "committed a serious criminal act".

In December 2021, Ben-Gvir was investigated after a video surfaced of him pulling a handgun on Arab security guards during a parking dispute in the underground garage of the Expo Tel Aviv conference center. The guards asked Ben-Gvir to move his vehicle as he was parked in a prohibited space. He then drew a pistol and brandished it at the guards. Both parties taunted each other, and Ben-Gvir claimed that he felt his life threatened. The guards were unarmed. He was criticized by lawmakers across the aisle, and the incident was investigated.

In January 2022, his level of security was increased. Due to frequent death threats, Ben-Gvir is accompanied by multiple security guards in public, and extra security measures are taken to ensure his safety.

In October 13, 2022, in the Sheikh Jarrah neighborhood of East Jerusalem, Ben-Gvir took part in the clashes between Israeli Jewish settlers and the local Palestinian residents, brandishing a gun, telling the police to shoot at Palestinians throwing stones at the scene, and yelling at them that "We're the landlords here, remember that, I am your landlord." This was a message that was later repeated by him in a tweet on the morning after the 2022 election in his victory tweet.

In the 2022 Israeli legislative election, Ben-Gvir's party had an unprecedented success, more than doubling its votes from the 2022 Israeli legislative election, thus becoming the 3rd largest party in the 25th Knesset. Ben-Gvir and his party are expected to be an integral part of a Netanyahu-led government. It was reported in late November 2022 that Ben-Gvir would head the newly created National Security Ministry, whose duties would include overseeing the Israel Border Police in the West Bank.

On 3 January 2023, Ben Gvir, as national security minister, visited the Temple Mount, which prompted a wave of international criticism from the United States, European Union, and Arab countries including Jordan, Egypt, Saudi Arabia and the United Arab Emirates, who termed his visit as provocative and called on Israel to respect the status quo of holy sites. Ben Gvir had been long accused of being a provocateur, having previously led several visits to the Temple Mount as activist and member of Knesset, contentious marches through Jerusalem's Old City Muslim Quarter, and set up an office in the Sheikh Jarrah neighborhood which witnessed Israeli-Palestinian tensions.

Personal life 
Ben-Gvir is married to Ayala Nimrodi, a distant relative of Ofer Nimrodi, the former owner of the Maariv daily newspaper. The couple has five children, and they live in the Israeli settlement of Kiryat Arba/Hebron, which is deemed illegal under international law, in the Israeli-occupied West Bank.

References 

1976 births
Living people
Israeli people of Kurdish-Jewish descent
Israeli Orthodox Jews
Israeli Kahanists
Otzma Yehudit politicians
People from Hebron
Israeli settlers
Israeli lawyers
Ono Academic College alumni
Members of the 24th Knesset (2021–2022)
Anti-Arabism in Israel